Abdul Salem Jamshid (born 1980) is an Afghan football player. He has played for Afghanistan national team.

National team statistics

External links

1981 births
Living people
Afghan footballers
Footballers at the 2002 Asian Games
Association football goalkeepers
Asian Games competitors for Afghanistan
Afghanistan international footballers